The 2006 Monte Carlo Masters was a men's tennis tournament played on outdoor clay courts. It was the 100th edition of the Monte Carlo Masters and was part of the ATP Masters Series of the 2006 ATP Tour. It took place at the Monte Carlo Country Club in Roquebrune-Cap-Martin, France from 17 April through 23 April 2006.

The men's singles was headlined by world No. 1 Roger Federer, Rafael Nadal and David Nalbandian. Second-seeded Rafael Nadal won the singles title.

Finals

Singles

 Rafael Nadal defeated  Roger Federer 6–2, 6–7(2–7), 6–3, 7–6(7–5)

Doubles

 Jonas Björkman /  Max Mirnyi defeated  Fabrice Santoro /  Nenad Zimonjić 6–2, 7–6(7–2)

References

External links
 
 ATP tournament profile
 ITF tournament edition details

 
Monte Carlo Masters
Monte-Carlo Masters
2006 in Monégasque sport
Monte